Alina Sergeyevna Gridneva (born 2 March 1992) is a Russian freestyle skier who competes internationally.
 
She participated at the 2018 Winter Olympics.

References

1992 births
Living people
Russian female freestyle skiers
Olympic freestyle skiers of Russia
Freestyle skiers at the 2018 Winter Olympics